James Brown (1933–2006) was an American recording artist and musician.

James, Jim, or Jimmy Brown may also refer to:

Authors, editors, and publishers 
 J. B. Selkirk (1832–1904), Scottish poet and essayist, born James Brown
 James Brown (author) (born 1957), American novelist and memoirist
 James Brown (editor) (born 1965), English editor and media entrepreneur
 James Brown (publisher) (1800–1855), American publisher and co-founder of Little, Brown and Company
 James Cooke Brown (1921–2000), American sociologist and science fiction author

Clergymen 
 James Brown (moderator) (1724–1786), moderator of the Church of Scotland in 1777
 James Brown (academic) (1709–1784), English clergyman and academic
 James Brown (Archdeacon of Perth) (1820–1895), Canadian Anglican priest
 James Brown (bishop of Louisiana) (born 1932), American Episcopal bishop
 James Brown (bishop of Shrewsbury) (1812–1881), English Roman Catholic bishop
 James Brown (Dean of Edmonton), Canadian Anglican priest
 James Brown (Scottish clergyman) (1734–1791), clergyman in the Scottish Episcopal Church
 James Baldwin Brown (1820–1884), British Congregational minister
 James Mellor Brown, British cleric and scriptural geologist

Film, radio, and television personnel 
 J. Anthony Brown, American comedian and actor
 James Brown (actor) (1920–1992), American actor
 James Harmon Brown, American television writer with Barbara Esensten
 Jim Brown (born 1936), American former football player and actor
 Jim Brown (director) (born 1950), American film director
 Jim Brown (radio host), host of the Calgary Eyeopener
 James Hall (actor) (James E. Brown, 1900–1940), American actor
 James S. Brown Jr. (1892–1949), American cinematographer

Military personnel 
 James Brown (sailor) (1826–1905), American sailor who fought in the American Civil War
 James E. Brown III (born 1954), United States Air Force officer and test pilot
 James R. Brown (1930–2015), general in the United States Air Force
 James Sutherland Brown (1881–1951), Canadian general and war planner
 James Brown (Medal of Honor) (1847–?), United States Army sergeant

Musicians 

 Djämes Braun, Danish singer
 James Brown (Elvis impersonator) (born 1968), Belfast-born Elvis impersonator
 James Brown (guitarist) (born 1984), English guitarist in Pulled Apart by Horses
 James Clifford Brown (1923–2004), English composer
 James Conway Brown (1838–1908), Welsh musician
 James Francis Brown (born 1969), British composer
 Jim Ed Brown (1934–2015), American country music singer
 Jimmy Brown, bassist for the psychobilly band Bodeco
 Jimmy Brown (musician) (1926–2006), American trumpeter, saxophonist, and singer
 James Brown, drummer in the reggae band UB40

Politicians

Australia 
 James Drysdale Brown (1850–1922), member of the Victorian Legislative Council
 Jim Brown (New South Wales politician) (1918–1999), member of the New South Wales Legislative Assembly
 Jim Brown (Western Australian politician) (born 1927), member of the WA Legislative Council and Legislative Assembly

Canada 
 James Brown (Canadian politician) (1828–1897), Ontario businessman and politician
 James Brown (New Brunswick politician) (1790–1870), member of the Legislative Assembly of New Brunswick between 1830 and 1861
 James C. Brown (1868–1937), Ontario farmer and political figure
 James Elisha Brown (1913–1974), member of the Canadian House of Commons from 1953 to 1957 and 1962 to 1971
 James Pollock Brown (1841–1913), Canadian politician
 James Thomas Brown (1871–1957), lawyer, judge and political figure in Saskatchewan
 Jim Brown (Ontario politician) (born 1943), member of the Legislative Assembly of Ontario from 1995 to 1999

New Zealand 
 James Clark Brown (1830–1891), New Zealand MP in 1870 & 1871–1890

United Kingdom and Isle of Man 
 James Brown (MP for Malton) (1814–1877), British Liberal Party politician
 James Brown (Northern Ireland politician) (1897–?), MP for South Down, Northern Ireland
 James Brown (Scottish politician) (1862–1939), MP for Ayrshire, Scotland
 James Clifton Brown (1841–1917), member of Parliament of the United Kingdom for Horsham, 1876–1880
 James Gordon Brown (born 1951), Prime Minister of the United Kingdom, 2007–2010
 Tony Brown (Manx politician) (James Anthony Brown, born 1950), Chief Minister of the Isle of Man

United States 
 James Brown (Connecticut politician) (1682–1769), member of the Connecticut House of Representatives from Norwalk
 James Brown (Louisiana politician) (1766–1835), U.S. Senator from Louisiana, 1813–1817 and 1819–1823
 James Brown (South Dakota judge) (c. 1864–1936), Justice of the South Dakota Supreme Court
 James Harvey Brown (1906–1995), city council member in Los Angeles, California
 James M. Brown (attorney) (born 1941), Attorney General of Oregon from 1980 to 1981
 James S. Brown (1824–1878), mayor of Milwaukee, Wisconsin in 1861 and member of U.S. House of Representatives, 1863–1865
 James Stephens Brown (–1947), mayor of Nashville, Tennessee
 James W. Brown (1844–1909), member of the U.S. House of Representatives from Pennsylvania, 1903–1905
 Jim Brown (interpreter) (born 1953), State Department language interpreter
 Jim N. Brown (1926–1991), Michigan politician

Sportspeople

American football players and coaches
 James Brown (American football guard) (born 1988), American professional football player for the Chicago Bears
 James Brown (offensive tackle) (born 1970), American professional football player from 1993 to 2000
 James Brown (quarterback) (born 1975), American college football player for the University of Texas
 James A. Brown (1900–1965), American football and basketball coach
 James M. Brown (coach) (1892–1965), American college football, basketball, and baseball coach
 Jim Brown (born 1936), American former football player and actor

Association football 
 James Brown (1890s footballer), Scottish footballer for Manchester United, Dundee Our Boys, and Dundee
 James Brown (Australian soccer) (born 1990), Australian soccer player
 James Brown (footballer, born 1862) (1862–1922), England international footballer
 James Brown (footballer, born 1902) (1902–1965), English football goalkeeper for Darlington
 James Brown (footballer, born 1907) (1907–?), Scottish footballer
 James Brown (footballer, born 1919) (1919–2005), Scottish footballer
 James Brown (footballer, born 1987), English footballer
 James Brown (footballer, born January 1998), English-Maltese footballer
 James Brown (footballer, born June 1998), Irish footballer
 Jim Brown (footballer, born 1939) (1939–2015), Scottish footballer (Dumbarton, Darlington)
 Jim Brown (footballer, born 1950), Scottish footballer (Hearts, Hibernian)
 Jim Brown (footballer, born 1952), Scottish footballer (Sheffield United)
 Jim Brown (soccer, born 1908) (1908–1994), Scottish-American soccer player
 Jim Brown (Cowdenbeath footballer) (died 1955), Scottish footballer
 Jimmy Brown (footballer, born 1869) (1869–1924), Scottish footballer for Renton, Aston Villa, Leicester Fosse 
 Jimmy Brown (football manager), Scottish football manager (Dumbarton)
 Jimmy Brown (footballer, born 1924) (1924–2002), Scottish footballer (Bradford City)
 Jimmy Brown (footballer, born 1925) (1925–2008), Scottish footballer (Hearts, Kilmarnock)
 Jimmy Brown (footballer, born 1953) (born 1953), Scottish footballer who played for Aston Villa

Baseball players 
 Jim Brown (catcher) (1892–1943), American baseball catcher and first baseman
 Jim Brown (outfielder) (1897–1944), baseball player
 Jim Brown (pitcher) (1860–1908), baseball pitcher in 1884 and 1886
 Jimmy Brown (baseball) (1910–1977), American baseball player
 James Brown (baseball) (1919–?), American baseball player

Other sportspeople 
 James Brown (BMX rider) (born 1989), Canadian BMX rider
 James Brown (bowls), Scottish lawn bowls player
 James Brown (cricketer) (1931–2014), Scottish cricketer
 James Brown (cyclist), Northern Ireland cyclist
 James Brown (rugby league) (born 1988), English rugby league player
 James Brown (sportscaster) (born 1951), American sportscaster formerly for Fox and presently for CBS and Showtime
 James Victor Brown (1935–2020), Australian rugby player
 Jim Brown (basketball) (1912–1991), American professional basketball player
 Jim Brown (darts player) (born 1971), Scottish darts player
 Jim Brown (ice hockey) (born 1960), retired American professional ice hockey defenseman
 Jim Brown (sprinter) (1909–2000), Canadian sprinter
 Jim J. Brown (1925–1995), Australian rules footballer for Geelong
 Jim W. Brown (1926–2014), Australian rules footballer for Fitzroy
 Jimmy Brown (cricketer) (1864–1916), cricketer
 Jimmy Brown (tennis) (born 1965), retired American professional tennis player
 Jimmy White (aka Jimmy Brown, born 1962), snooker player

Other people 
 James Brown (artist) (born 1951), American painter active in Paris
 James Brown (Australian pastoralist) (1819–1890), South Australian philanthropist
 James Brown (ecologist) (born 1942), American ecologist and academic
 James Brown (engraver) (1819–1877), New Zealand engraver, caricaturist, and drawing tutor
 James Brown (hair stylist) (born 1969), Irish hair stylist
 James Brown (journalist), British correspondent on the TV channel RT
 James Brown (magician), British magic-performer
 James A. C. Brown (1911–1964), Scottish psychiatrist
 James Boyer Brown (1919–2009), Australian gynaecologist
 James Duff Brown (1862–1914), British librarian
 James Graham Brown (1881–1969), American businessman and real estate developer
 James Howard Brown (1884–1956), American bacteriologist
 James Joseph Brown (1854–1922), American mining businessman
 James MacLellan Brown ( – 1967), Scottish architect
 James Robert Brown (born 1949), Canadian philosopher
 James Smedley Brown, 19th-century American educator of the deaf
 James William Brown (1897–1958), English physician
 Jim Brown (computer scientist) (born 1943), American computer scientist with IBM
 Jim Brown (multihull designer), multihull sailboat designer
 Jimmy Brown (Irish republican) (1956–1992), activist and paramilitary leader
 James Failla (1919–1999), also known as Jimmy Brown, member of the Gambino crime family
 James Stephens Brown (Mormon) (1828–1902), American mormon, participant of the California Gold Rush
 James Brown (internet personality), Nigerian internet personality
 James Campbell Brown, chemist and professor
 James H. Brown (judge) (1818–1900), West Virginia judge
 James Johnston Mason Brown, Scottish paediatric surgeon

Other 
 "James Brown", a song by Cage the Elephant from the 2008 album Cage the Elephant
 "James Brown" (song), a 1989 song by Big Audio Dynamite
 "James Brown Is Dead", a 1991 song by L.A. Style
 Jimmy Brown, a character from the animated miniseries Over the Garden Wall
 "The Three Bells", a 1959 song also known as "The Jimmy Brown Song", "Little Jimmy Brown", or "Jimmy Brown"

See also 
 Jamie Brown (disambiguation)
 Jim Brown (disambiguation)
 James Browne (disambiguation)